LessWrong (also written Less Wrong) is a community blog and forum focused on discussion of cognitive biases, philosophy, psychology, economics, rationality, and artificial intelligence, among other topics.

Purpose
LessWrong promotes lifestyle changes believed by its community to lead to increased rationality and self-improvement. Posts often focus on avoiding biases related to decision-making and the evaluation of evidence. One suggestion is the use of Bayes' theorem as a decision-making tool. There is also a focus on psychological barriers that prevent good decision-making, including fear conditioning and cognitive biases that have been studied by the psychologist Daniel Kahneman.

LessWrong is also concerned with transhumanism, existential threats and the singularity. The New York Observer noted that "Despite describing itself as a forum on 'the art of human rationality,' the New York Less Wrong group... is fixated on a branch of futurism that would seem more at home in a 3D multiplex than a graduate seminar: the dire existential threat—or, with any luck, utopian promise—known as the technological Singularity... Branding themselves as 'rationalists,' as the Less Wrong crew has done, makes it a lot harder to dismiss them as a 'doomsday cult'."

History 

LessWrong developed from Overcoming Bias, an earlier group blog focused on human rationality, which began in November 2006, with artificial intelligence theorist Eliezer Yudkowsky and economist Robin Hanson as the principal contributors. In February 2009, Yudkowsky's posts were used as the seed material to create the community blog LessWrong, and Overcoming Bias became Hanson's personal blog. In 2013, a significant portion of the rationalist community shifted focus to Scott Alexander's Slate Star Codex.

LessWrong and its surrounding movement are the subjects of the 2019 book The AI Does Not Hate You, written by former BuzzFeed science correspondent Tom Chivers.

Roko's basilisk

In July 2010, LessWrong contributor Roko posted a thought experiment to the site in which an otherwise benevolent future AI system tortures people who heard of the AI before it came into existence and failed to work tirelessly to bring it into existence, in order to incentivise said work. Using Yudkowsky's "timeless decision" theory, the post claimed doing so would be beneficial for the AI even though it cannot causally affect people in the present. This idea came to be known as "Roko's basilisk", based on Roko's idea that merely hearing about the idea would give the hypothetical AI system stronger incentives to employ blackmail. Yudkowsky deleted Roko's posts on the topic, saying that posting it was "stupid" as the dissemination of information that can be harmful to even be aware of is itself a harmful act, and that the idea, while critically flawed, represented a space of thinking that could contain "a genuinely dangerous thought", something considered an information hazard. Discussion of Roko's basilisk was banned on LessWrong for several years because Yudkowsky had stated that it caused some readers to have nervous breakdowns. The ban was lifted in October 2015.

David Auerbach wrote in Slate "the combination of messianic ambitions, being convinced of your own infallibility, and a lot of cash never works out well, regardless of ideology, and I don't expect Yudkowsky and his cohorts to be an exception. I worry less about Roko's Basilisk than about people who believe themselves to have transcended conventional morality."

Roko's basilisk was referenced in Canadian musician Grimes's music video for her 2015 song "Flesh Without Blood" through a character named "Rococo Basilisk" who was described by Grimes as "doomed to be eternally tortured by an artificial intelligence, but she's also kind of like Marie Antoinette". After thinking of this pun and finding that Grimes had already made it, Elon Musk contacted Grimes, which led to them dating. The concept was also referenced in an episode of Silicon Valley titled "Facial Recognition".

The Basilisk has been compared to Pascal's wager.

Neoreaction
The neoreactionary movement first grew on LessWrong, attracted by discussions on the site of eugenics and evolutionary psychology. Yudkowsky has strongly rejected neoreaction. In a survey among LessWrong users in 2016, 28 out of 3060 respondents, or 0.92%, identified as "neoreactionary".

Effective altruism 
LessWrong played a significant role in the development of the effective altruism (EA) movement, and the two communities are closely intertwined. In a survey of LessWrong users in 2016, 664 out of 3,060 respondents, or 21.7%, identified as "effective altruists". A separate survey of effective altruists in 2014 revealed that 31% of respondents had first heard of EA through LessWrong, though that number had fallen to 8.2% by 2020. Two early proponents of effective altruism, Toby Ord and William MacAskill, met transhumanist philosopher Nick Bostrom at Oxford University. Bostrom's research influenced many effective altruists to work on existential risk reduction.

References

External links 
 
  — survey of LessWrong subculture opinions

Internet forums
Transhumanist organizations
Internet properties established in 2009